Transition is the second studio album by British rapper Chipmunk. It was released on 15 April 2011 by Jive Records in the United Kingdom. It is the last album to feature the stage name under Chipmunk. The album debuted at number 10 in the United Kingdom, with first-week sales of 9,445 copies.

Background 
While discussing Transition, Chipmunk said, "It kinda represents the growth in me as a person since my last album, so the sound has matured as well as I have and that’s the main thing for me with the record - I just wanted the sound, the sound and the feel of the album to feel… I feel like a granddad but you know, just more mature than my first album, you know life’s changed." The album features American artists Keri Hilson, Chris Brown, Trey Songz, Kalenna Harper from Diddy-Dirty Money, Jamaican dancehall musician Mavado and British rapper Wretch 32. In late 2010, the second single off Transition, "Champion" had leaked onto the Internet. In an interview with BBC Newsbeat, Chipmunk said: "When it [the track] leaked, I was looking at the sky asking, 'God, why?’ I just didn't understand. The amount of thought process that went into that track, the amount of battles we had for that track."

Singles 
"Flying High" was a promotional single released from the album. It was released on 12 November 2010 for digital download. Its highest charting position on the UK Singles Chart is number 72. "Champion" was the second single released from the album, and features vocals from American singer Chris Brown and was released on 6 February 2011. It peaked at number two on the UK Singles Chart. The third single released from the album - on 11 April 2011 - was "In The Air" featuring vocals from US R&B singer/songwriter Keri Hilson, which peaked at Number 37 on the UK Singles Chart.
"Every Gyal" topped the Jamaican chart and went to number 1.

Critical reception 

Transition received mixed to positive reviews from most music critics. 
Robert Copsey of Digital Spy was positive, he commented that After dazzling us with his 'Diamond Rings' two years ago and platinum selling debut I Am Chipmunk, the one-time underground MC withdrew from the music scene after criticism came from his original fans for abandoning his roots and a non-stop promo schedule led to a bout of exhaustion. The result of his sabbatical is his aptly titled Transition LP, but does it live up to its promising name? Transition is an impressive effort that focuses as much on the lyrics as it does production - both of which are slick, on point and considered throughout. The album suffers from being two tracks too long, particularly as there is little deviance in subject matter, but it's nonetheless a significant step up from his debut that ultimately leaves us excited for his next metamorphosis. Jesal Padania of RapReviews gave a glowing review, praising the "underrated gem" for being coherent, whilst reserving special praise for the dominant producer, H-Money.

Track listing

Charts

Release history

References

2011 albums
Chipmunk (rapper) albums
Albums produced by Harmony Samuels